The 2015–16 season was AEL Kalloni's third season in the Super League Greece, the first tier of Greek football. They relegated to the Football League, while they reached the Round of 16 in the Greek Cup.

Club

Coaching staff

Other information

Pre-season friendlies

The basic stadium of the preparation took place from July 19 to 31 to Peio, Trentino, Italy.

Last updated: 5 September 2015Source: AEL Kalloni F.C.

Competitions

Overall

Last updated: 17 April 2016Source: Competitions

Overview

{| class="wikitable" style="text-align: center"
|-
!rowspan=2|Competition
!colspan=8|Record
|-
!
!
!
!
!
!
!
!
|-
| Super League Greece

|-
| Greek Cup

|-
! Total

Super League Greece

League table

Results summary

Results by matchday

Matches
The fixtures were announced on 14 July 2015.

Last updated: 17 April 2016Source: Superleague Greece

Greek Cup

Second round

Group H

Round of 16

PAOK won 4–2 on aggregate.

Last updated: 14 January 2016Source: HFF

Players

Squad statistics

Appearances and goals

Key

No. = Squad number

Pos. = Playing position

Apps = Appearances

GK = Goalkeeper

DF = Defender

MF = Midfielder

FW = Forward

Numbers in parentheses denote appearances as substitute. Players with number struck through and marked  left the club during the playing season.

Source: Superleague Greece

Top scorers
 	

Source: Superleague Greece

Disciplinary record

Last updated: 17 April 2016Competitive matches only * indicates a second yellow cardSource: Superleague Greece

Suspended players

Source: AEL Kalloni F.C.

Injuries

Players in bold are still out from their injuries.  Players listed will/have miss(ed) at least one competitive game (missing from whole matchday squad).

  'Return date' is date that player returned to matchday squad.Source: Kalloni F.C.

Transfers

Summer

In

Loaned in

Out

Loaned out

Winter

In

Out

Loaned in

Infrastructure leagues

U20

Pos = Position; Pld = Matches played; Pts = Points

U17

First Group

Pos = Position; Pld = Matches played; Pts = Points

References

2015–16
Greek football clubs 2015–16 season